Caloptilia staintoni is a moth of the family Gracillariidae. It is known from the Canary Islands and Madeira.

The larvae feed on Apollonias barbujana, Laurus azorica, Persea americana and Persea indica. They mine the leaves of their host plant. The mine consists of a lower-surface, epidermal corridor, reminding of a snail's trail. In the end, the mine widens into a full depth tentiform mine, with loosely dispersed frass. Older larvae live freely in a leaf cone. Mines are only made on the youngest leaves. Pupation takes place in a shining yellow cocoon.

References

staintoni
Moths of Africa
Moths described in 1858